Brex Inc is an American financial service and technology company based in San Francisco, California. Brex offers business credit cards and cash management accounts to technology companies. Brex cards are business charge cards, which require at least $50,000 in a bank account if professionally invested, if not with $100,000 to open, and cardholders who default won't damage their personal credit or assets. Emigrant Bank issues the Brex cards.

History 
Brex was founded by Brazilians Henrique Dubugras and Pedro Franceschi on January 3, 2017. They had previously founded an online payments company, Pagar.me, before selling it to Stone.

Brex did not start as a fintech startup but rather as a VR startup, however the founders pivoted the company three weeks into Y Combinator's 12-week accelerator program.

In February 2021, the company announced a submission application with the Federal Deposit Insurance Corporation (FDIC) and the Utah Department of Financial Institutions (UDFI) to establish an industrial bank named Brex Bank, a wholly-owned subsidiary of Brex. According to TechCrunch, the subsidiary appointed a "former Silicon Valley Bank exec as CEO".

In April 2022, Brex launched Brex Empower, a financial software platform to help people comply with their employers' expense policies. In June 2022, Brex exited the SMB market, shifting the company's focus to serving enterprise customers. In August 2022, Brex named Doug Adamic as the company's new Chief Revenue Officer.

According to CNBC, Brex received billions of dollars in deposits from Silicon Valley Bank customers on March 9, 2023.

Growth 

Brex Inc. is backed by Peter Thiel, Ribbit Capital, Y Combinator, DST Global, Kleiner Perkins, Lone Pine Capital, and Greenoaks.

References 

Privately held companies based in California
Financial services companies established in 2017
American companies established in 2017
Companies based in San Francisco
Y Combinator companies